Donald Featherstone (January 25, 1936 – June 22, 2015) was an American artist most widely known for his 1957 creation of the plastic pink flamingo while working for Union Products. Featherstone resided in Fitchburg, Massachusetts, where he kept 57 plastic flamingos on his back lawn. Featherstone and his wife Nancy dressed alike for over 35 years.

Biography
Featherstone was born in Worcester, Massachusetts, in 1936 and grew up in nearby Berlin. After graduating from the Worcester Art Museum's art school, in 1957, he was offered a job designing three-dimensional animals for Union Products, Inc. Over his years at Union Products, Featherstone sculpted over 750 different items, the first two of which were a girl with a water can and a boy with a dog. When Featherstone was asked in 1957 to sculpt a duck, he purchased one, which he named Charlie, and later released the bird in Coggshall Park.  Later that year, he was asked to carve a flamingo. The now iconic pink flamingo went on sale in 1958, when the color pink was popular.

In 1996, Featherstone was awarded the 1996 Ig Nobel Art Prize for his creation of the pink flamingo, and he also began his tenure as president of Union Products, which he held until he retired in 2000.

On June 22, 2015, Featherstone died from Lewy body dementia at the age of 79. Visitors often leave pink flamingos of their own on the lawn around his grave.

Pink flamingo

Featherstone based his creation on photographs of flamingos from National Geographic, as he was not able to obtain real flamingos to use as models. As time went on, the plastic flamingo became more popular. They appeared across the country and even as parts of various art exhibits. In 1987, Donald Featherstone inscribed his signature in the original plastic mold. This was apparently to help distinguish between original and "knock-off" pink plastic flamingos. Featherstone's signature stayed on the bird until 2001, when it was removed. The signature was quickly replaced because of a small boycott of the unsigned birds.

In November 2006, Union Products closed and production of the flamingo stopped. Shortly thereafter, a New York company purchased the molds for Featherstone's flamingos and subcontracted production to a Fitchburg company, Cado Products. In 2010, Cado Products purchased the copyrights and plastic molds for the pink flamingos and continues to manufacture them.

References

External links
 The Guardian: "RIP pink plastic flamingo"

1936 births
2015 deaths
Deaths from dementia in Massachusetts
Deaths from Lewy body dementia
People from Leominster, Massachusetts
People from Worcester, Massachusetts
People from Fitchburg, Massachusetts
Sculptors from Massachusetts
People from Worcester County, Massachusetts